The 1996 United States presidential election in Virginia took place on November 5, 1996, as part of the 1996 United States presidential election. Voters chose 13 representatives, or electors to the Electoral College, who voted for president and vice president.

Virginia was won by Senator Bob Dole (R-KS), 47.10% to 45.15% over incumbent President Bill Clinton (D-AR) producing a margin of 1.95%. Billionaire businessman Ross Perot (Reform-TX) finished in third, with 6.62% of the popular vote.

, this marked the last time a Democrat was elected without winning Virginia. Virginia was also the only state Bill Clinton lost twice but Hillary Clinton won, as she managed a 5% victory in the state in 2016. , this was also the last time Bath, Allegheny, Giles, Smyth, Tazewell, Lee, Wise, Dinwiddie, Accomack Counties, and the independent cities of Galax and Buena Vista voted for a Democratic presidential candidate. The election was, however, the first time the Democratic Presidential nominee had carried Prince Edward County – famous for its Civil Rights-era school desegregation cases – since Harry S. Truman in 1948, and the first time since 1968 that Essex County had voted Democratic.

This remains the only time in history that a Democratic president has won re-election without carrying Virginia.

Results

Results by county

Notes

References

Virginia
1996
1996 Virginia elections